The Fulbright Economics Teaching Program (FETP) is a partnership of the University of Economics, Ho Chi Minh City and the Harvard Kennedy School. The school is based in Vietnam and its website is both in Vietnamese and English. It has an Open Source Education portal available to everyone in the world similar to MIT OpenCourseWare and actually very influenced by it as mentioned in the website.

The FETP OpenCourseWare is available free of charge for anyone who would like to educate him/herself in economics. Their motto is the following: "Inspired by the Massachusetts Institute of Technology’s OpenCourseWare Initiative (OCW), the Fulbright School has begun to publish its teaching and research materials online. FETP OpenCourseWare is not a long-distance learning project, rather it is a resource for people working or studying in policy-related fields to increase their knowledge and explore new approaches to learning and curriculum development."

See also

References

Harvard University
Universities in Ho Chi Minh City
1994 establishments in Vietnam